Basilissa is a feminine form of the Greek title basileus ("king" or "emperor"). 

Basilissa may also refer to:

Basilinna  or Basilissa, the ritual queen who was wed to Dionysus during the Anthesteria in ancient Athens
Basilissa (gastropod), a genus in the family Seguenziidae
Basilissa (name)

See also
Basilia (disambiguation)
Basilica (disambiguation)
Vasilisa (name)
Vasilissa (disambiguation)